Constructed in 1884, Taipei North Gate, formally Cheng'en Gate,  is the best-preserved gate of the Walls of Taipei, and is a National Monument of Taiwan. Its design is a 2-story closed blockhouse of solid construction with traditional Chinese wooden roof truss and streamlined carved ornamentations.  Important in the Qing layout of the city, restoring it to visual prominence in the city has been a feature of recent urban planning.
It gives its name to Beimen metro station.

References

References

Buildings and structures completed in 1884
Buildings and structures in Taipei
Taipei
History of Taipei